Anne Hampton Potts (born October 28, 1952) is an American actress. She was nominated for a Golden Globe Award for Corvette Summer (1978) and won a Genie Award for Heartaches (1981), before appearing in Ghostbusters (1984), Pretty in Pink (1986), Jumpin' Jack Flash (1986), Who's Harry Crumb? (1989), and Ghostbusters II (1989). She voiced Bo Peep in the first, second and fourth films of the Toy Story franchise (1995, 1999, and 2019).

On television, Potts played Mary Jo Jackson Shively on the CBS sitcom Designing Women (1986–1993). She was nominated for a 1994 Primetime Emmy Award for playing Dana Palladino on the CBS sitcom Love & War (1993–1995), she played teacher Louanne Johnson on ABC drama Dangerous Minds for one season 1996–1997, and was nominated for Screen Actors Guild Awards in 1998 and 1999 for playing Mary Elizabeth Sims in the Lifetime drama series Any Day Now (1998–2002). Her other television credits include GCB (2012), The Fosters (2013–2018), and Young Sheldon (2017–present).

Early life and education
Potts was born in Nashville, Tennessee, as the third child of Dorothy Harris (née Billingslea) and Powell Grisette Potts. Her older sisters are Mary Eleanor (Potts) Hovious and Elizabeth Grissette ("Dollie") Potts. They grew up in Franklin, Kentucky, where she graduated from Franklin-Simpson High School in 1970.

She attended Stephens College in Columbia, Missouri, and graduated with a Bachelor's degree  in theater. Potts and her first husband, Steven Hartley, were in a car crash that left several bones below her waist broken, including compound fractures to both legs, and the loss of the heel of her right foot; Hartley lost his left leg.

Career
Potts made her debut on the big screen in 1978 in the Metro-Goldwyn-Mayer comedy film Corvette Summer, with Mark Hamill. She was nominated for a Golden Globe Award in 1979 for her role in the film. In 1982, she won Genie Awards for Best Performance by a Foreign Actress for her role in the film Heartaches, about a young woman married to a stock car racer and carrying his friend's child. In 1980, she played Edith Bedelmeyer, a woman who shared an attic apartment with three other women (played by Georgia Engel, Lorna Patterson, and Francine Tacker) on the short-lived comedy series, Goodtime Girls.

Potts played receptionist Janine Melnitz in the Ghostbusters film series; being from Tennessee, Potts created the character's trademark New York accent based on a friend's who was from the city. She then achieved fame as pragmatic interior designer Mary Jo Shively on the CBS television sitcom Designing Women (1986–1993), and has had a wide variety of prominent roles in both television and film. She was nominated for a Primetime Emmy Award for Outstanding Lead Actress in a Comedy Series in 1994 for her role as Dana Palladino on Love & War (1993–1995). Other notable roles include Mary Elizabeth (O'Brien) Sims on the Lifetime Television drama series Any Day Now (1998–2002), for which she was nominated for two Screen Actors Guild Award for Outstanding Performance by a Female Actor in a Drama Series, the voice of Bo Peep in three of the Toy Story films, a supporting role in John Hughes's Pretty in Pink, and guest-starring roles on such CBS's television series as Magnum, P.I., Joan of Arcadia, Close to Home, Two and a Half Men, and ABC's Men in Trees, Ugly Betty, and Boston Legal. She played a recurring role as Sophie Devere in the NBC's Law & Order: Special Victims Unit from 2005 to 2009.

Potts has done work on audio books; including as the narrator and heroine of Larry McMurtry's Telegraph Days, winning the 2007 Audie Award for Solo Narration-Female, for her portrayal. She starred in the film version of McMurtry's Texasville, a sequel to The Last Picture Show. She made her Broadway debut upon joining the cast of the Tony Award–winning play God of Carnage on November 17, 2009, succeeding Hope Davis in the role.

In 2012, Potts starred as Elizabeth "Gigi" Stopper in ABC's comedy-drama series GCB, with Leslie Bibb, Kristin Chenoweth, Jennifer Aspen, Miriam Shor, and Marisol Nichols. She says she based her portrayal of the character on Dixie Carter, adding, "Were she still alive, the role would have been hers and should have been." Potts also played a leading role in the 2012 Hallmark Channel original musical movie The Music Teacher, about a high-school music teacher who is on the brink of losing her beloved school music program because of district budget cuts. In an effort to spare the program, Daley's former students band together to stage a musical to raise money to keep the program alive.

In March 2013, Potts signed on for the lead role of the ABC comedy-drama pilot Murder in Manhattan about a mother and daughter who team up as amateur sleuths. ABC later looked for a cable network to distribute the series, opting not to air it on network television. In late 2013, it was announced that Potts would join Diane Paulus' critically acclaimed revival of Pippin beginning January 21, 2014. She replaced Tony Award nominee Tovah Feldshuh in the role of Pippin's grandmother Berthe. This marked her first appearance in a Broadway musical.

Starting in 2017, she is a series regular on the CBS sitcom Young Sheldon as Connie "Meemaw" Tucker.

Personal life
Potts is the mother of three sons: one with her third husband Scott Senechal, and two with James Hayman.

Filmography

Film

Television

Video games

Stage

Awards and nominations

References

External links

 
 
 
 
 
 
 

1952 births
20th-century American actresses
21st-century American actresses
Actresses from Kentucky
Actresses from Nashville, Tennessee
American film actresses
American stage actresses
American television actresses
American voice actresses
Audiobook narrators
Best Performance by a Foreign Actress Genie Award winners
Living people
People from Franklin, Kentucky
Stephens College alumni